Richard L. Rosenthal, Jr. (born June 15, 1949) is an American film instructor and director, known for directing Halloween II and Halloween: Resurrection.

Early life, family and education
Rosenthal was born in New York City, the son of Hinda (née Gould) and entrepreneur Richard L. Rosenthal, Sr.

Career
Rosenthal started his career by directing Halloween II and returned to the series 21 years later, helming Halloween: Resurrection. In between he has directed films such as American Dreamer (1984), Russkies (1987), Distant Thunder (1988) and Just a Little Harmless Sex (1998). He also directed dozens of episodic television shows, and was co-executive producer of the landmark Warner Bros. TV series  Life Goes On for  ABC from 1989-1991.

Personal life
Rosenthal met his wife, actress Nancy Stephens, while filming Halloween II.

Select filmography as a director

Film
 Halloween II (1981)
 Bad Boys (1983)
 American Dreamer (1984)
 Russkies (1987)
 Distant Thunder (1988)
 Just a Little Harmless Sex (1998)
 Halloween: Resurrection (2002)
 Nearing Grace (2005)
 Drones (2013)

Television
Darkroom (3 episodes, 1981-1982)
Nasty Boys (1989, pilot)
Yesterday Today (1992, unsold pilot)
The Witches of Eastwick (1992, unsold pilot)
Devlin (1992, television film; released theatrically in the Philippines as New York Mob War)
The Birds II: Land's End (1994, television film), credited as Alan Smithee
Early Edition (2 episodes, 1996–1997)
Dellaventura (1 episode, 1997)
The Practice (1 episode, 1997)
Wasteland (1 episode, 1999)
Law & Order: Special Victims Unit (2 episodes, 1999–2000)
Strong Medicine (1 episode, 2000)
Providence (6 episodes, 2000–2001)
The District (6 episodes, 2001–2003)
Buffy the Vampire Slayer (2 episodes, 2002)
Crossing Jordan (1 episode, 2002)
She Spies (1 episode, 2003)
Smallville (7 episodes, 2003–2008)
Tru Calling (2 episodes, 2004–2005)
Point Pleasant (1 episode, 2005)
Reunion (3 episodes, 2005–2006)
Veronica Mars (1 episode, 2006)
Flash Gordon (1 episode, 2007)
The Dresden Files (1 episode, 2007)
90210 (1 episode, 2009)
Being Erica (3 episodes, 2009–2010)
Greek (1 episode, 2009)
Mental (1 episode, 2009)
Life on Mars (1 episode, 2009)
Haven (1 episode, 2010)
Drop Dead Diva (1 episode, 2010)
Gigantic (2 episodes, 2010)
Shattered (2 episodes, 2010)
Beauty & the Beast (1 episode, 2013)

References

External links

1949 births
Living people
AFI Conservatory alumni
American television directors
Choate Rosemary Hall alumni
Film directors from New York City
Film producers from New York (state)
Harvard University alumni
Independent Spirit Award winners